Fisherville may refer to some places in North America:

Canada
Fisherville, British Columbia, a one-time gold-mining boom town
Fisherville, Ontario

United States
Fisherville, Indiana
Fisherville, Louisville, Kentucky, a neighborhood
Fisherville, Blair County, Pennsylvania
Fisherville, Dauphin County, Pennsylvania
Fisherville, Tennessee
Mereta, Texas, also called Fisherville
Fisherville, Wisconsin, an unincorporated community